Class of Nuke 'Em High Part 3: The Good, the Bad and the Subhumanoid (credited onscreen as The Good, the Bad and the Subhumanoid: Class of Nuke 'Em High Part 3) is a 1994 American science-fiction horror comedy film directed by Eric Louzil and distributed by Troma Entertainment. It is the third installment of the Class of Nuke 'Em High film series.

Plot
Moments after the end of the second film, the mutant squirrel Tromie is subdued and life in Tromaville returns to normal. Roger Smith, now mayor of Tromaville, is overjoyed at the birth of his twin sons, Dick and Adlai. Unfortunately for all concerned parties, Dick is kidnapped at the hospital and subsequently raised to be evil by the thugs who took him. Adlai, meanwhile, is raised by Roger to be kind and peaceful.

Flashing-forward several years into the future, when Dick and Adlai are adults, trouble comes in the form of the loathsome Dr. Slag, Ph.D., who uses Dick to frame Adlai for a crime he did not commit in the hopes of turning the denizens of Tromaville against him. If his wily plot works, Slag will turn the town into a toxic wasteland; with destruction looming, it is up to Adlai to save the day.

The plot is loosely based on William Shakespeare's The Comedy of Errors. The only thing carried over is the storyline of the twins being separated and a later identity crisis following. Not much else remains the same.

Cast
 Brick Bronsky as Mayor Roger Smith / Adlai Smith / Dick Smith / Baby Moishe Smith
 Eric Robert Louzil as young Adlai Smith / young Dick Smith
 Lisa Star as Trish
 John Tallman as Dr. Slag, Ph.D.
 Lisa Gaye as Professor Melvina Holt
 Albert Bear as Li'l Eggwhite
 Phil Rivo as Werewolf Clone / Mad Scientist / Phil Man
 Elizabeth Young as Eliana
 Valerie McConnell as Lisa
 Kathleen Kane as Angel Finkelstein
 Lizette Faz as Souzie Schwartz
 Ron Hyatt as a Professor
 Leesa Rowland as Victoria
 Lloyd Kaufman (uncredited) as Voice of helicopter pilot

Production

Casting
Class of Nuke 'Em High 2 did not use cast from Class of Nuke 'Em High. Class of Nuke 'Em High 3 carried over the cast and characters of Class of Nuke 'Em High 2.

Wrestler-turned-actor Brick Bronsky started his career with Troma in early 1990 during the filming of the superhero film Sgt. Kabukiman N.Y.P.D. (1991) as the henchman 'Jughead'. Kaufman and Herz enjoyed working with Brosnky so much that they offered him a lead in Class of Nuke 'Em High 2 which was filmed in 1991.

Thinking that Bronsky had good star power, he was brought back for the third film in three different roles (in the trailer, he is credited for four roles) to showcase his acting career in hopes of getting him noticed by more people as the talented actor they thought he was.

During the marketing, Troma advertised him as their own action star, giving him a parade in Cannes and talking about him as if he was just as big as any other action star out there. Despite the advertising to help the film and Bronsky's career, the film did not get noted much out of Troma's fanbase and Bronsky only appeared in a handful of films following the third Nuke 'Em High, often in the henchman role.

Filming
Like its immediate predecessor, it was filmed in Los Angeles, California, and not New York City, New York — as in the original, and most in-house Troma Entertainment productions.

Release
After having trouble releasing its films with other distributors (Warner Home Video, Fox, Lorimar, etc.), Troma created its own distribution company in 1995 under the label Troma Team Video and Class of Nuke 'Em High 3 was advertised as the company's first major release on VHS. Held back for a year and only released on video, Class of Nuke 'Em High 3 became legendary not for its content, but for what it represented — that the company had taken a huge step forward in labeling and marketing its own films.

After a couple of years as one of its biggest sellers, Class of Nuke 'Em High 3 went out of print, and with the decline of video, Troma decided not to re-release it because — despite being highly popular with fans — it felt that the film itself was inferior to some of its other titles.

Home media
In the mid-2000s, Troma released a Class of Nuke 'Em High box set, which featured the original 1986 film in the same DVD format it had had since 1997 and Class of Nuke 'Em High 2 which had just recently been released on its own. For years, the box set was the only way of being able to buy the third film on DVD. However, in early 2010, alongside a re-release of the 1986 film by the Troma Retro label, the third film was released separately.

References

External links
 
 

1994 films
1990s English-language films
1990s comedy horror films
1990s science fiction films
American science fiction comedy films
American independent films
American satirical films
American science fiction horror films
Films set in New Jersey
Films shot in Los Angeles
American sequel films
Troma Entertainment films
1994 comedy films
1990s American films